The Answer Is Always Yes is the upcoming third studio album by Australian singer-songwriter Alex Lahey. It will be released on 19 May 2023 via Liberation Music, and supported by a North American tour from May to June. It will be Lahey's first record to feature external songwriters and co-producers, marking a stylistic departure from her first two albums.

Release 
On 1 September 2022, lead single "Congratulations" was issued alongside a music video and dates for a regional tour beginning in October 2022. Upon the release, Lahey explained she was "drawn to examine her past relationships, and reckon with the feeling she had when seeing her former partners move on". She also hinted that the single was "the first taste in a long-awaited new chapter". On 11 November, second single "Shit Talkin'" was released. The record was officially announced on 1 February 2023 following the premiere of third single, "Good Time", on Triple J.

Track listing

Personnel 

 Alex Lahey – vocals, writing ; producer 
 Jacknife Lee – writing, producer 
 John Mark Nelson – writing 
 John Castle – producer 
 Bradley Hale – writing 
 Pooneh Ghana – cover artwork

References 

Alex Lahey albums
2023 albums